The Ngurlu, also known as the Ngulutjara or Ngurlutjarra, are an Aboriginal Australian people of Western Australia.

Country
Their northwestern frontier ran to Mount Ida. Their eastern limits were around Lake Raeside and Yerilla, and the ephemeral salt lake known as Lake Ballard. The Ngurlu moved about over mugla scrublands as far south as where their natural boundary with the Maduwongga began, as the mulga yields way to mallee Eucalypt country, with its salmon gum bushland.

History
As colonial intrusions advanced into the general area, whether from gold miners or people who took up large pastoral leases, considerable pressure was put on all tribes and the westward movement of the Waljen and Nangatadjara overwhelmed the Ngurlu.

Alternative names
 Jan.
 Jata.
 Njata.
 Nata.
 Ngulutjara.
 Nguludjara.
 Kuru.
 Kurutjara.

Notes

Citations

Sources

Aboriginal peoples of Western Australia
Goldfields-Esperance